The following lists events that happened during 1938 in Cape Verde.

Incumbents
Colonial governor: Amadeu Gomes de Figueiredo

Events

Births
February 24: Manuel de Novas (d. 2009), poet and composer
November 1: Manuel Figueira, artist

References

 
1938 in the Portuguese Empire
Years of the 20th century in Cape Verde
1930s in Cape Verde
Cape Verde
Cape Verde